Zürich Wipkingen railway station is a railway station in the Wipkingen quarter of the Swiss city of Zürich. It is situated on the Zürich–Winterthur railway line, which was built by the Swiss Northeastern Railway (Schweizerische Nordostbahn).

The route towards  leads over the Wipkingen viaduct (Wipkinger Viadukt). Immediately at the northern end of the station, the Wipkingen Tunnel starts and connects it to Zürich Oerlikon.

Service 
Wipkingen station is served only by S-Bahn-style regional trains. As of December 2022, the station is served half-hourly by line S24 of the Zürich S-Bahn.

History 
The station lies on the oldest of several rail routes from the city center to the northern part of Zürich. Although the Zürich–Winterthur railway line opened in 1856, Wipkingen did not get its own railway station before 2 October 1932. Between 1908 and 1968, a tram (line 4) connected Escher-Wyss Platz with Röschlibachplatz adjacent to Wipkingen station. Urban transport has since been replaced by trolleybus services (lines 33 and 46).

Prior to the opening of the Weinberg Tunnel on 14 June 2014, this station was served by Zürich S-Bahn lines S2, S8 and S14. These lines now run via the new tunnel route, and the half-hourly S24 was extended from Hauptbahnhof further north in order to ensure that Wipkingen did not lose rail service.

Gallery

References

External links 

Swiss Federal Railways stations
Wipkingen
Railway stations in Switzerland opened in 1932